Square packing in a square is a packing problem where the objective is to determine how many squares of side one (unit squares) can be packed into a square of side .

Small numbers of squares

The smallest value of  that allows the packing of  unit squares is known when  is a perfect square (in which case it is ), as well as for 2, 3, 5, 6, 7, 8, 10, 13, 14, 15, 24, 34, 35, 46, 47, and 48.
The figure shows the optimal packings for 5 and 10 squares, the two smallest numbers of squares for which the optimal packing involves tilted squares.

The smallest unresolved case involves packing 11 unit squares into a larger square.
By contrast, the tightest known packing of 11 squares is inside a square of side length approximately 3.877084 found by Walter Trump.

Asymptotic results
For larger values of the side length , the exact number of unit squares that can pack an  square remains unknown.
It is always possible to pack a  grid of axis-aligned unit squares,
However, as Klaus Roth and Bob Vaughan proved, all solutions must waste space at least . In particular, when  is a half-integer, the wasted space is at least proportional to its square root. The precise asymptotic growth rate of the wasted space, even for half-integer side lengths, remains an open problem. 

Some numbers of unit squares are never the optimal number in a packing. In particular,
if a square of size  allows the packing of  unit squares, then it must be the case that 
and that a packing of  unit squares is also possible.

Square packing in a circle 
A related problem is that of packing n unit squares into a circle with radius as small as possible. For this problem, good solutions are known for n up to 35. Here are minimum solutions for n up to 12:

See also
Circle packing in a square
Squaring the square
Rectangle packing
Moving sofa problem

References

External links

 

 
Packing problems
Unsolved problems in geometry